Dealer is an Australian nu metalcore supergroup from Australia that was formed in 2018. The group is composed of vocalist Aidan Ellaz Holmes, drummer Joe Abikhair, guitarists Seth Murrant and Jake Rakose, and bassist Maurice Morfaw.

History

Following Aidan Holmes' departure from Alpha Wolf, he met with former Northlane member Alex Milovic, Capture drummer Joe Abikhair, Codeine King guitarist Josh Ang, and Iconoclast member David Wilder to form a new band. On 5 April 2019, they released their debut EP Soul Burn. Soul Burn being well received along with the announcement of being signed to Stay Sick Records.

On 22 July 2019, Wilder, Ang, and, Milovic left the band citing various reasons for their departure. Wilder citing irreconcilable differences between him and the remaining members, Ang citing a focus on his mental health, and Milovic citing a shift away from touring to focus on the managerial side of the band. They were replaced by former Capture bassist Maurice Morfaw, and The Gloom in the Corner guitarist Martin Wood. On 14 February 2020, the band released their second EP Saint. Following the release of Saint, they were joined by Harmed guitarist and Codeine King bassist Gabor Toth

Prior to the Covid-19 pandemic, the band would depart for their first and only U.S.A tour opening for American deathcore band Spite on their "The Root of All Evil" tour. They were joined by Varials, I AM, Orthodox, and UnityTX.

On 22 June 2020, four of the band's five members left over sexual abuse allegations against Aidan, effectively ending the band.

On 8 January 2023, an anonymous Instagram account leaked that the band has returned and will be releasing a new single "Show Me The Body" on January 13, 2023. Three previous members returned; Joe Abikhair, Aidan Ellaz Holmes, and Maurice Morfaw; with two new members; Seth Murrant and Jake Rakose.

Members
Current members
 Aidan Ellaz Holmes – lead vocals (2019–present)
 Joe Abikhair - drums (2018–present)
 Maurice Morfaw - guitars (2019–2020), bass (2019-2020, 2023-present)
 Seth Murrant - guitars (2023–present)
 Jake Rakose - guitars (2023-present)

Former members
 Alex Milovic – bass (2018-2019)
 Josh Ang – guitars (2018-2019)
 David Wilder –  guitars (2018-2019)
 Martin Wood – guitars, bass (2019-2020)
 Gabor Toth – bass (2020)

Former touring members
 Peter Colver – bass (2019-2020)

Timeline

Discography

Extended plays
 Soul Burn (2019)
 Saint (2020)

References

2019 establishments in Australia
Australian musical groups
Australian metalcore musical groups
Australian nu metal musical groups
Musical groups established in 2019
Musical groups disestablished in 2020
Musical groups reestablished in 2023
Musical quintets